Vijay Chandar is an Indian film director who is known for directing the Tamil-language film Vaalu (2015).

Career 
Vijay Chandar made his directorial debut with Vaalu (2015). The film began production in 2012 and released in 2015 after much delay. The film marked Silambarasan's return after a three-year hiatus and released to positive reviews. A critic stated that "Overall, Vaalu is yet another romantic action entertainer which is watchable just for STR’s energetic screen presence and his comic chemistry with Santhanam". Chandar's next film was Sketch (2018) starring Vikram. The film received mixed reviews upon release but the film was a commercial success. The film also marked the return of Vikram after one year. A critic wrote that "A predictable action drama that ends up star-worshipping its protagonist a tad too much". His next film was Sangathamizhan (2019) with Vijay Sethupathi, which released to negative reviews. A critic noted that " But the weakly written villain characters, with miscast actors who never make us feel like they could be a threat to the protagonist, and the sameness of the stunt scenes pull the film down, leaving it lacking punch".

Filmography

Director

Producer
FILMWORKS is an Indian Film Production Company, founded by Vijay Chandar.

References

External links 
 

21st-century Indian film directors
Indian film directors
Tamil film directors
Living people
Year of birth missing (living people)